Julie K. Brown (born 1961) is an American investigative journalist with the Miami Herald best known for pursuing the sex trafficking story surrounding Jeffrey Epstein, who in 2008 was allowed to plead guilty to two state-level prostitution offenses. She is the recipient of several awards including two George Polk Awards for Justice Reporting.

Brown was included in Time magazines 100 Most Influential People of 2020.

Early life and career 
Brown was raised near Philadelphia, Pennsylvania by a single parent. She left home at 16 and worked in menial jobs before she could afford to attend college. She graduated magna cum laude from Temple University in 1987 with a degree in journalism.

After college, Brown worked for the Philadelphia Daily News before joining the Miami Herald a daily newspaper owned by the McClatchy Company, around 2000.

While at the Miami Herald, Brown spent four years investigating patterns of abuse in the Florida prison system. Her reporting work prompted a 2018 federal investigation into civil rights abuses in Lowell Correctional Institution in Central Florida.

Brown has been credited with re-opening the Jeffrey Epstein sexual abuse case with a series of reports published in November 2018. She began investigating Epstein in early 2017 and persisted in uncovering facts about the large number of accusers and the pressure campaign to silence them. Brown uncovered 80 potential victims (as young as 13 and 14 years old when the abuse occurred) and documented the eight individuals who agreed to tell their stories.  In 2008 Epstein had been allowed to plead guilty to only two state-level prostitution offenses, even though sex with underage girls is legally rape. The secret deal that then-US Attorney Alex Acosta struck with Epstein made federal sex trafficking charges disappear, shut down an FBI probe that might have uncovered dozens of victims, and granted immunity to any possible co-conspirators, a clause that allegedly protected powerful men. Her 2018 reporting on the deal and Acosta's role in it sparked criticism of Acosta, who by then had become the United States secretary of labor, and there was pressure for him to resign. He eventually resigned after Epstein was arrested and charged in July 2019. After Epstein was re-arrested, many commentators praised her and the Herald for their reporting. "This is what happens when a reporter refuses to give up on a story," The Columbia Journalism Review wrote on Twitter following Epstein's arrest. Geoffrey Berman, a federal prosecutor for the Southern District of New York, also commented at a news conference that his team had been “assisted by some excellent investigative journalism.” But she tweeted in response "The Real Heroes Here were the courageous victims that faced their fears and told their stories". Brown’s articles were collected under the title  "Perversion of Justice" and resurfaced on social media.

In July 2020, Brown’s book, Perversion of Justice, based on her reporting on the Epstein case, was published by William Morrow and Company. The book will serve as the foundation for a limited series on HBO to be executive produced by Brown, along with Kevin Messick and Adam McKay.

Awards 
Brown won a 2014 George Polk Award in Justice Reporting from Long Island University for "Cruel and Unusual," her series of articles on "the brutal, sometimes fatal mistreatment of Florida prison inmates with mental illnesses."

Brown received a second George Polk Award in the category of Justice Reporting in 2018 for her investigative journalism on "Perversion of Justice." Her series covered the extensive number of accusers in the Epstein case and the role of federal prosecutor Alex Acosta who permitted a non-prosecution agreement that protected four named conspirators and "granted immunity to any possible co-conspirators, a proviso that seemed to protect the powerful men Epstein partied with."

In April 2019, Alan Dershowitz (an associate of Epstein who was one of his attorneys during his criminal investigation in 2006-2008) tried to pressure the Pulitzer prize committee to shut out Brown and the Miami Herald for her investigative reporting that reopened the Epstein case. In an open letter Dershowitz wrote that Brown should not be rewarded for her work. She was not.  At the start of her investigative reporting on Epstein, Brown had been warned by former Police Chief Michael Reiter to expect pushback as other members of the media who attempted to report on Epstein had been reassigned following a phone call to their publisher. Reiter stated “Somebody’s going to call your publisher and the next thing you know you are going to be assigned to the obituaries department.”

Brown received the National Press Club Journalism Institute's 2019 Neil and Susan Sheehan award for investigative journalism in October 2019.

In December 2019, Brown and her Miami Herald colleague Emily Michot were jointly recognized for their five-part series "Perversion of Justice," with a Sidney Award, the Hillman Prize for Journalism in the Common Good, from the Sidney Hillman Foundation.

Personal life 
Brown has two children, one daughter and one son.

References

External links 
'Potentially hundreds' of victims seek federal prison for Epstein, CNBC February 22, 2019
As some local news outlets struggle, Julie K. Brown is hopeful non-profits can fill the gaps, The Washington Post live, April 4, 2019

1960s births
Living people
American women journalists
21st-century American journalists
Miami Herald people
George Polk Award recipients
Year of birth missing (living people)
Temple University alumni
American investigative journalists
21st-century American women